George W. Sams Jr. (born c. 1946) was a member of the Black Panther Party convicted in the 1969 murder of New York Panther Alex Rackley, which resulted in the New Haven Black Panther trials of 1970.

Sams turned state's evidence in return for a reduced charge of second-degree murder. He testified that, acting under direct orders from national party leader Bobby Seale, he arranged for the kidnapping of Rackley to Panther headquarters in New Haven, where Rackley was tortured for two days then transported to the marshlands of Middlefield, Connecticut, where he was shot by Warren Kimbro and Lonnie McLucas on Sams' orders. According to Hugh Pearson, who wrote the book The Shadow of the Panther: Huey Newton and the Price of Black Power in America:

 

Neither Kimbro nor McLucas corroborated Sams' testimony regarding Seale's involvement.  Sams and Kimbro were convicted of murder, and Lonnie McLucas was acquitted on all charges except conspiracy to commit murder, but a jury deadlocked on the charges against Seale and Black Panther leader Ericka Huggins, and the charges against both were dropped. Members of the Black Panther party accused Sams of being an FBI informant.

In popular culture

 Terayle Hill portrays Sams in the film Judas and the Black Messiah. The film depicts Sams as an FBI informant and that his testimony against Bobby Seale was done under orders of the FBI in order to keep Seale imprisoned.

References

 Bobby Seale's Shadow Gadfly Online

1946 births
Living people
American people convicted of murder
Members of the Black Panther Party
COINTELPRO targets
People convicted of murder by the United States federal government
Prisoners sentenced to life imprisonment by the United States federal government